Elachista titanella is a moth of the family Elachistidae. It is found in the central Caucasus Mountains in Russia.

The length of the forewings is 5–6 mm. The wing pattern is variable, ranging from almost unicolorous pale ochreous to brownish grey. In darker specimens, the broad pale fascia and blurred tornal and costal spots are discernible. The costal spot is found beyond the tornal spot.

References

titanella
Moths described in 1994
Moths of Europe